Paul Goad (September 7, 1934 – November 29, 1978) was an American football fullback. He played for the San Francisco 49ers in 1956.

References

1934 births
1978 deaths
American football fullbacks
Vanderbilt Commodores football players
Abilene Christian Wildcats football players
San Francisco 49ers players